Edward Horace Sampson (December 21, 1921 in Fort Frances, Ontario – August 26, 1974) was an ice hockey player who played for the American national team. He won a silver medal at the 1956 Winter Olympics.

References

1921 births
1974 deaths
American men's ice hockey players
Canadian emigrants to the United States
Ice hockey people from Ontario
Ice hockey players at the 1956 Winter Olympics
Medalists at the 1956 Winter Olympics
Olympic silver medalists for the United States in ice hockey
Sportspeople from Fort Frances